James Harrison (1891–1986) was an American film actor. He began his career acting in short films in 1911. He was a supporting actor during much of the silent era. Although he continued to appear in films until the 1950s, many of his latter roles were small, uncredited parts.

Selected filmography

 The Flirt and the Bandit (1913)
 The Tale of the Ticker (1913)
 Madame Bo-Peep (1917)
 The Bad Boy (1917)
 Should She Obey? (1917)
 Lessons in Love (1921)
 Wedding Bells (1921)
 The Barricade (1921)
 A Heart to Let (1921)
 Women Men Marry (1922)
 Beyond the Rainbow (1922)
 Why Announce Your Marriage? (1922)
 Glengarry School Days (1923)
 Charley's Aunt (1925)
 Stop Flirting (1925)
 In Search of a Hero (1926)
 College Days (1926)
 Backstage (1927)
 Husband Hunters (1927)
 The Wife's Relations (1928)
 Handcuffed (1929)
 The Seventh Commandment (1932)
 King Kong (1933)
 Let 'Em Have It (1935)
 The Public Menace (1935)
 She Couldn't Take It (1935)
 The Lawless Nineties (1936)
 The Saint in Palm Springs (1941)
 The Mexican Spitfire's Baby (1941)
 Up in Arms (1944)
 The Woman in the Window (1944)
 King of the Bandits (1947)
 Panhandle (1948)
 Silent Conflict (1948)
 Silver River (1948)
 Borrowed Trouble (1948)
 Law of the West (1949)
 Stampede (1949)
 Western Renegades (1949)
 Fighting Man of the Plains (1949)
 Ambush (1950)
 Key to the City (1950)
 Annie Get Your Gun (1950)
 Vengeance Valley (1951)
 Inside Straight (1951)
 The Tall Target (1951)
 Carbine Williams (1952)

References

Bibliography
 Goble, Alan. The Complete Index to Literary Sources in Film. Walter de Gruyter, 1999.

External links

American male film actors
American male stage actors
1891 births
1986 deaths
People from  Milwaukee